The  is a  network of expressways surrounding Osaka, Kobe and Kyoto, Japan.

These sections were rebuilt by 1996. Portions of the Osaka highway are featured in Tokyo Xtreme Racer 3, and the Wangan Midnight Maximum Tune video games from 3 onwards.

Routes
1 - Loop Route (Central Osaka)
2 - Yodogawa-Sagan Route (Hokko-kita - Universal Studios Japan)
3 - Kobe Route (Nishi-Nagahori - Amagasaki - Nishinomiya - Kobe)
4 - Bayshore Route (Osakako - Rinku Town, Kansai Airport)
5 - Bayshore Route (Osakako - Rokko Island)
6 - Yamatogawa Route (Sakai - Matsubara)
7 - Kita-Kobe Route (Igawadani - Shirakawa - Minotani - Arima - Nishinomiya-Yamaguchi)
11 - Ikeda Route (Umeda - Toyonaka - Osaka Airport - Kawanishi - Ikeda) 
12 - Moriguchi Route (Kitahama - Moriguchi)
13 - Higashi-Osaka Route (Central Osaka - Higashi-Osaka)
14 - Matsubara Route (Namba - Hirano - Matsubara)
15 - Sakai Route (Sumiyoshi - Suminoe - Sakai)
16 - Ōsakakō Route (Nishi-Nagahori - Osakako)
17 - Nishi-Osaka Route (Bentencho - Sumiyoshi)
31 - Kobe-Yamate Route (Kobe - Shirakawa)
32 - Shin-Kobe Tunnel (National Highway Route 2 - Minotani)

Former Hanshin route
8 - Kyoto Route (Fushimi - Yamashina) (transferred to West Nippon Expressway Company and Kyoto City, renamed to E89 Second Keihan Highway southwest of Kamogawa-Higashi interchange, and Shinjūjōdōri east of same IC (also free opened))

See also

References

External links
 

 
Expressways in Japan
Roads in Hyōgo Prefecture
Roads in Kyoto Prefecture
Roads in Osaka Prefecture